Żytno  is a village in Radomsko County, Łódź Voivodeship, in central Poland. It is the seat of the Gmina (administrative district) called Gmina Żytno.

The village has a population of 710.

History

The village of Żytno was ceded to Poland at the Treaty of Versailles in 1919. Today, it is still in present-day Poland.

References

Villages in Radomsko County
Piotrków Governorate
Łódź Voivodeship (1919–1939)